Sinophaena is a small genus of east Asian anyphaenid sac spiders. It was first described by Y. J. Lin, Yuri M. Marusik and C. X. Gao in 2021, and it has only been found in China.  it contains only two species: S. bivalva and S. xiweni.

See also
 List of Anyphaenidae species

References

Further reading

Anyphaenidae genera
Spiders of China